Haven N. Shoemaker, Jr. (born January 26, 1965) is an American politician who is currently the State's Attorney for Carroll County, Maryland. He previously served as a Republican member of the Maryland House of Delegates from 2015 to 2022, and as the House minority whip in 2022. He also previously served as a Carroll County Commissioner, as Mayor of Hampstead, Maryland, and as a member of the Hampstead Town Council.

Early life and career
Shoemaker was born in Baltimore, Maryland. After graduating from North East High School in North East, Maryland, he attended the University of Maryland, Baltimore County, where he earned a B.A. degree in political science in 1987, and Widener University School of Law, where he earned a J.D. degree magna cum laude in 1992. In between universities, he served in the Army National Guard for two years.

Shoemaker was admitted to the Maryland Bar in 1992 and has operated his own law office since 1994, when he moved in Hampstead.

In 1995, Shoemaker unsuccessfully ran for the Hampstead Town Council. In 1996, he ran to fill a vacancy in the town council left by the resignation of Dwight W. Homer, but lost to Seth Shipley. He ran again in 1997, winning the election with 227 votes. He served on the town council until he was elected the town's mayor in 2003. He ran on a ticket alongside outgoing mayor Christoper Nevin. In November 2005, Shoemaker announced his candidacy for the Maryland House of Delegates in District 5A. He received 14.7 percent of the vote in the Republican primary election. He ran unopposed in 2007.

Carroll County Commissioner
In 2010, Shoemaker was elected to the Carroll County Board of County Commissioners, representing District 2. He was sworn in on December 6, 2010.

While on the Carroll County board of commissioners, Shoemaker introduced an "English only" ordinance which was passed unanimously in 2013. He opposed an unsuccessful 2020 proposal to repeal the ordinance which he has called his idea.

In June 2013, Shoemaker voted to block Carroll County residents and businesses from paying Maryland's stormwater fee, calling the tax "idiotic".

Shoemaker announced his candidacy for the Maryland House of Delegates on June 24, 2013. He won the primary election with 17.3 percent of the vote and defeated Democratic candidates Dorothy G. Scanian and Zachary Hands in the general election with 27.2 percent of the vote.

In the legislature
Shoemaker was sworn into the Maryland House of Delegates on January 14, 2015. He served as the House Minority Whip in 2022.

In 2016, Shoemaker ran for alternative RNC delegate from Maryland's 1st congressional district in the Republican primary, pledged to Marco Rubio. He voted for Donald Trump in the general election, albeit "not happily".

Shoemaker was re-elected in 2018, during which he ran on a "Team Hogan" platform alongside state Senator Justin Ready and Delegates Susan Krebs and April Rose.

In July 2021, Shoemaker announced his candidacy for Carroll County State's Attorney, opting out of a third term in the legislature. He won the Republican primary on July 19, 2022, receiving 57.3 percent of the vote.

Committee assignments
 Member, Judiciary Committee, 2021–2022
 Joint Committee on Administrative, Executive and Legislative Review, 2019–2022
 Rules and Executive Nominations Committee, 2022
 Legislative Policy Committee, 2022
 Member, Ways and Means Committee, 2015–2021 (finance resources subcommittee, 2015–2017; education subcommittee, 2015–2020; election law subcommittee, 2017–2021; early childhood subcommittee, 2021)

Other memberships
 Minority Parliamentarian, 2017–2021
 Chief Deputy Minority Whip, 2021
 House Chair, Carroll County Delegation, 2017–2022
 Member, Maryland Legislative Sportsmen's Caucus, 2015–2022
 Maryland Veterans Caucus, 2015–2022

Political positions

Abortion
In May 2019, Shoemaker accused Maryland Comptroller Peter Franchot of "playing partisan politics" in asking officials to review whether the state's pension system had investments in Alabama after the state passed laws restricting access to abortions.

In March 2022, Shoemaker voted against legislation that would create a ballot referendum to enshrine access to reproductive care into the Constitution of Maryland.

In April 2022, Shoemaker voted against legislation that would expand abortion access by expanding who can perform abortions and providing financial support to train health care professionals to offer reproductive services, calling it the "most radical expansion of abortion in Maryland's history in a state that already has some of the most liberal abortion laws in the country."

Business
In December 2020, the Maryland Free Enterprise Association gave Shoemaker a score of 100 percent in its annual legislative scorecard.

COVID-19 pandemic
In June 2020, Shoemaker attended the Carroll County Freedom Rally to protest the state's coronavirus restrictions. Later in the month, Shoemaker authored a Baltimore Sun op-ed "Gov. Hogan deserves an 'F' for his handling the pandemic, roepening", that argued Governor Hogan wasn't doing enough to reopen businesses in Maryland amid the COVID-19 pandemic. In November 2020, he authored another op-ed, "With Republicans like Gov. Hogan, who needs Democrats?", that accused Governor Larry Hogan of setting up a "snitch hotline" that allows Marylanders to call in crowd-size violations to law enforcement authorities.

In September 2021, Shoemaker voted against regulations that would implement an universal mask mandate in public schools. In February 2022, he called on Governor Hogan to repeal the state's school masking policy.

Education
Shoemaker introduced legislation in the 2016 legislative session that would limit standardized testing for kindergarten students and prevent any future testing of prekindergarten students. The bill passed and became law on April 26, 2016.

In February 2020, Shoemaker voted against legislation that would reverse a Labor Day start date for all public schools in Maryland. In March 2020, Shoemaker voted against the Blueprint for Maryland's Future reform bill.

Elections
Shoemaker introduced legislation in the 2022 legislative session that would require election officials to verify signatures on all mail-in ballots, and another bill that would prohibit sending mail-in ballots to voters unless the voters requested them. Both bills did not receive a vote on the House floor.

Environment
Shoemaker opposed the Climate Solutions Now Act of 2021.

Guns
Shoemaker opposed legislation introduced in the 2022 legislative session that would require firearm dealers to install video surveillance and alarm systems at their gun shops, saying that he considered the security requirements "onerous".

Immigration
In July 2017, Shoemaker joined 35 of his House and Senate colleagues penned a letter questioning the legal merits of a lawsuit launched by Maryland Attorney General Brian Frosh over Executive Order 13769.

Policing and sentencing
In July 2020, Shoemaker hosted a rally outside of the Maryland State House to support law enforcement officials following the murder of George Floyd.

In March 2021, Shoemaker voted against the Maryland Police Accountability Act of 2021, arguing that it would cause a mass exodus of police officers from forces across the state. He also voted against legislation that would end life without parole sentences for juvenile offenders.

Social issues
In November 2020, Shoemaker called an anti-Donald Trump banner displayed at the house of a Carroll County Public Schools administrator "hate speech".

In April 2021, Shoemaker voted against legislation that would require schools to allow students to engage in peaceful demonstrations.

Shoemaker introduced legislation in the 2022 legislative session that would prohibit registered sex offenders from operating babysitting services.

In February 2022, Shoemaker voted against legislation that would create a ballot referendum to legalize recreational marijuana, saying it would be wrong to legalize marijuana before the state can conduct its study of its public health effects.

Electoral history

References

External links
 

Republican Party members of the Maryland House of Delegates
Living people
1965 births
Politicians from Baltimore
20th-century American politicians
21st-century American politicians
University of Maryland, Baltimore County alumni
Widener University School of Law alumni
State's attorneys in Maryland
Maryland city council members
County commissioners in Maryland